Tales Of Budapest is a 1937 Hungarian comedy film directed by Béla Gaál.

Cast 
 Ida Turay - Kis Klári, Copfos
 Antal Páger - Kubik
 Gyula Kabos - Vadász Lehel, az Atlantic Bank igazgatója
 Anni Dobos - Annie 
 Stephen Bekassy - Feri, Annie testvére
 Mária Mezei - Éva 
 Ilona Kökény - Vásárló hölgy
 Gerő Mály - A vásárló hölgy férje
 Manyi Kiss - Szubrett
 Kamill Feleki - Tánctanár 
 Lajos Köpeczi Boócz - Háziúr 
 Margit Vágóné - Szobaasszony
 Sándor Pethes - Vegetáriánus

References

External links 

 mandarchiv.hu

1937 comedy films
1937 films
Hungarian black-and-white films
Hungarian comedy films